James M. Leonard (February 17, 1950 ‒ November 3, 2014), also known as "Cyclone Jim", was an American professional storm chaser, photographer, and videographer. Intercepting severe weather including thunderstorms, tornadoes, hurricanes and typhoons, he was among the earliest storm chasers. He was the first to photograph an anticyclonic tornado.

Leonard was the son of Arthur H. Leonard Jr. and Marjorie Irene Leonard. He grew up in south Florida and in 1971 began chasing tropical cyclones in the United States and the Caribbean, as well as on Guam and Hawaii. He sometimes moved to Guam during typhoon season. He was considered a pre-eminent tropical cyclone chaser. Leonard began chasing thunderstorms in 1974 and traveled across the Great Plains as well as locally in Florida where sea breeze interactions and waterspouts are common in summer. He sometimes moved to Oklahoma during supercell season in Tornado Alley. Leonard's photographs, films and videos have been licensed widely and featured prominently around the world. He was featured in numerous television documentaries explaining hurricanes and magazine articles. He was a contributor to Storm Track magazine and his photographs appeared frequently in Weatherwise and other publications. Leonard was also an early and respected storm chasing tour guide, working with Charles Edwards for Cloud 9 Tours, where George Kourounis and Mike Theiss also are guides.

See also
 Timothy P. Marshall

References

External links
 Jim Leonard's "Cyclone Jim" website
 
 
 Cloud 9 Tours

1950 births
2014 deaths
Photographers from Florida
Storm chasers